Laurence Fletcher Arnold (June 8, 1891 – December 6, 1966) was a U.S. Representative from Illinois.

Born in Newton, Illinois, Arnold attended the public and high schools of his native city and the University of Chicago, Chicago, Illinois. He studied law. He engaged in banking and in the wholesale hay and grain business at Newton, Illinois, in 1916. He served in the State house of representatives from 1923 to 1927 and from 1933 to 1937. He served as delegate to the Democratic National Convention in New York in 1924.

Arnold was elected as a Democrat to the Seventy-fifth, Seventy-sixth, and Seventy-seventh Congresses (January 3, 1937 – January 3, 1943). He was an unsuccessful candidate for reelection in 1942 to the Seventy-eighth Congress and for election in 1950 to the Eighty-second Congress. He resumed former business interests. He served as president of Peoples State Bank. He died in Newton, Illinois on December 6, 1966. He was interred in Westlawn Memorial Park Cemetery.

References

1891 births
1966 deaths
Democratic Party members of the Illinois House of Representatives
Democratic Party members of the United States House of Representatives from Illinois
20th-century American politicians
People from Newton, Illinois
University of Chicago alumni
Businesspeople from Illinois
20th-century American businesspeople